Chacobo or Chakobo may refer to:
 Chácobo people, an ethnic group of Bolivia
 Chakobo language, a language of Bolivia

See also 
 Chacobos Airport, in Bolivia
 Chacabuco, an abandoned town in Chile
 Chakobsa, a language